Surodchana Khambao (born 23 December 1999) is a Thai weightlifter. She won the gold medal in the women's 49kg event at the 2021 World Weightlifting Championships held in Tashkent, Uzbekistan.

Career 

She competed at the 2017 Asian Indoor and Martial Arts Games held in Ashgabat, Turkmenistan in the women's 53kg event without winning a medal. She finished in 5th place.

In 2018, she won all three gold medals in the women's 53kg event at the Junior World Weightlifting Championships held in Tashkent, Uzbekistan. She also won the bronze medal in the women's 53kg event at the 2018 Asian Games held in Jakarta, Indonesia.

Major Results

References

External links 
 

Living people
1999 births
Place of birth missing (living people)
Surodchana Khambao
Weightlifters at the 2018 Asian Games
Medalists at the 2018 Asian Games
Surodchana Khambao
Asian Games medalists in weightlifting
World Weightlifting Championships medalists
Southeast Asian Games medalists in weightlifting
Surodchana Khambao
Competitors at the 2021 Southeast Asian Games
Surodchana Khambao